Robert Reed (born John Robert Rietz Jr.; October 19, 1932 – May 12, 1992) was an American actor. He played Kenneth Preston on the legal drama The Defenders from 1961 to 1965 alongside E. G. Marshall, and is best known for his role as patriarch Mike Brady, opposite Florence Henderson's role as Carol Brady, on the ABC sitcom The Brady Bunch, which aired from 1969 to 1974. He later reprised his role of Mike Brady on several of the reunion programs. In 1976, he earned two Primetime Emmy Award nominations for his guest-starring role in a two-part episode of Medical Center and for his work on the miniseries Rich Man, Poor Man. The following year, Reed earned a third Emmy nomination for his role in the miniseries Roots.

Early life 
Reed was born John Robert Rietz Jr. in the northern Chicago suburb of Highland Park, Illinois, the only child of Helen (née Teaverbaugh) and John Robert Rietz, who were high-school sweethearts and married at 18. Reed attended the West Division School in Community Consolidated School District 62 until 1939. His father worked for the government, and his mother was a homemaker. Reed spent his early childhood years in Navasota, Texas and Shawnee, Oklahoma, attending Woodrow Wilson Grade School before the family moved to Muskogee, Oklahoma. In Oklahoma, his father, John Sr., worked as a turkey/cattle farmer.

In his youth, Reed joined the 4-H agricultural club and showed calves, but was more interested in acting and music. While attending Central High School in Muskogee, he participated in both activities. Reed also took to the stage, where he performed and sang. He also worked as a radio announcer at local radio stations and wrote and produced radio dramas. Reed graduated from Muskogee Central in 1950, and enrolled at Northwestern University to study drama. During his years at Northwestern, Reed appeared in several plays under the direction of Alvina Krause, a celebrated Northwestern drama coach. Reed performed in more than eight plays in college, all with leading roles.

He later studied for one term at the Royal Academy of Dramatic Art in London. Upon returning to the United States, Reed appeared in summer stock in Eagles Mere, Pennsylvania. He later joined the off-Broadway theatre group "The Shakespearewrights", and played Romeo in Romeo and Juliet and had a lead role in A Midsummer Night's Dream. After leaving the Shakespearewrights, Reed joined the Studebaker Theatre company in Chicago. He eventually adopted the stage name Robert Reed and moved to Los Angeles in the late 1950s to further pursue his acting career.

Career 

Reed made his first guest-starring appearance in an episode of Father Knows Best in 1959. This led to guest roles on Men into Space and Lawman, as well as his first credited film appearance in Bloodlust!. In 1961, Reed landed his first television starring role in The Defenders alongside fellow Studebaker Theater performer E. G. Marshall, with the two playing a father-and-son team of defense attorneys. Marshall was also one of the founding members of the Actors Studio in New York; around this time, Reed himself became a member of the Studio, of which he would remain a member for the next 30 years. The Defenders was a hit with audiences and earned a total of 22 Primetime Emmy Award nominations (E.G. Marshall won two Emmys for his performance while the show won twice for Outstanding Drama Series). Ratings for the series were high during its first three seasons, but fell when CBS moved the series from Saturday nights to Thursday nights. CBS canceled The Defenders in 1965.

While appearing on The Defenders in 1964, Reed made his Broadway stage debut as Paul Bratter in Neil Simon's Barefoot in the Park, replacing Robert Redford. For the remainder of the decade, Reed appeared primarily in television guest spots, including roles in Family Affair, Ironside, The Mod Squad, and Bob Hope Presents The Chrysler Theatre. He also appeared in the 1968 film Star! and in the Broadway production of Avanti!.

The Brady Bunch 
Appearing in the Neil Simon play Barefoot in the Park led to two new contracts at Paramount Pictures and ABC, both in 1968. When Paramount had decided to turn the television version of Barefoot in the Park into a predominantly African-American show, they planned for Reed to star in something else. The new series was entitled The Brady Bunch and featured a widowed man with three boys marrying a divorced woman, with three girls. The series' creator, Sherwood Schwartz, said he was inspired to create the series after reading a news item in the Los Angeles Times stating that "more than 29 percent of all marriages included a child or children from a previous marriage." Schwartz thought the idea was "... the key to a new and unusual TV series. It was a revelation! The first blended family! His kids and her kids! Together!"   

Reed was the producers' second choice for the role of Mike Brady after Gene Hackman was rejected because he was largely unknown at the time. Also starring on The Brady Bunch was actress Florence Henderson, who played the role of Mike's wife Carol Brady after her best friend Shirley Jones turned down the role in favor of The Partridge Family. Also cast on the series was Ann B. Davis as the Bradys' maid Alice Nelson. Despite earning poor reviews from critics and never cracking the Top 30 during its five-season run, The Brady Bunch remained an audience favorite of the 1970s. Since its cancellation in 1974, the series had a healthy afterlife in syndication and spawned several spin-off series and two television reunion films, along with two parody films.

From the very beginning of the sitcom's debut in September 1969, Reed was unhappy with his role as Mike Brady. He felt that acting in the often silly program was beneath his training as a serious Shakespearean actor. Producers and directors found Reed difficult to work with both on and off the set. However, all of the cast got along well with him. In his efforts to bring more realism to the sitcom, Reed often locked horns with the program's creator and executive producer Schwartz. Reed regularly presented Schwartz with hand-written memoranda detailing why a certain motivation did not make sense or why it was wrong to combine elements of farce and satire. Schwartz generally ignored Reed's suggestions, although in an attempt to alleviate tension, Schwartz occasionally allowed Reed to direct some episodes. In a 1983 interview, Reed admitted that he often butted heads with Schwartz, stating, "We fought over the scripts. Always over the scripts. The producer, Sherwood Schwartz, had done Gilligan's Island...Just gag lines. That would have been what The Brady Bunch would have been if I hadn't protested."

Reed was particularly appalled by what would turn out to be the show's final episode "The Hair-Brained Scheme". He sent Schwartz a memo, picking apart his problems with the episode, but Schwartz did not receive the memo promptly enough to alter the script as Reed wanted. As a result, Reed refused to appear in the episode altogether. By this time, Schwartz was tired of Reed's antagonistic behavior and decided to replace him for the show's sixth season; however, the series was cancelled by ABC shortly thereafter. Reed later claimed that he originally accepted the role for financial reasons, but tried to remain positive despite his creative differences with Schwartz by reminding himself the series was primarily about the children. Reed masked his dissatisfaction in front of the camera, always performing professionally without any indication of his unhappiness. Despite his discontentment with the show, Reed genuinely liked all of his co-stars and was a father figure to the younger cast members. Co-star Susan Olsen became friends with Reed's daughter Karen, who made a guest appearance in the episode "The Slumber Caper". Reed's final appearance in the series was in the penultimate episode "The Hustler". His final line in that episode was "Now I can get my car in the garage."

During the run of The Brady Bunch, Reed also had a recurring role as Lieutenant Adam Tobias on Mannix, from 1969 to 1975, and typically appeared in three to five Mannix episodes each season. He also directed several episodes of The Brady Bunch during its run. After Reed's agents overbooked him for a film in England with Anglia Television, his cancellation led to the 1972 court case of Anglia Television Ltd v Reed.

Later career 
After The Brady Bunch series ended in 1974, Reed acted on stage and made guest star appearances on other television series and television movies, including Pray for the Wildcats and SST: Death Flight. He won critical acclaim for his portrayal of Pat Caddison, a doctor who comes out as transgender, in a two-part episode of Medical Center in 1975. The episode also earned him a Primetime Emmy Award nomination. Also that year he appeared in the TV-movie The Secret Night Caller, as a respectably married man with a compulsion to make obscene phone calls to women he barely knows. Reed appeared in the television film The Boy in the Plastic Bubble (1976), the miniseries Rich Man, Poor Man (1976), and the miniseries Roots (1977). Reed was again nominated for an Emmy Award for his work in Rich Man, Poor Man and Roots. He also guest-starred on Wonder Woman, Hawaii Five-O, Charlie's Angels, Galactica 1980 and Vega$.

In 1981, Reed won the lead role of Dr. Adam Rose on the medical drama Nurse. Despite critical acclaim, the series was canceled the following year. In 1986, he played the role of Lloyd Kendall on the daytime soap opera Search for Tomorrow. He also made multiple appearances on Fantasy Island, Hunter, The Love Boat and Murder, She Wrote.

Despite his dislike of The Brady Bunch and the character of Mike Brady, Reed continued to appear in Brady Bunch spinoffs and sequels for the remainder of his career. In 1976, Reed reprised the role of Mike Brady in the variety show The Brady Bunch Hour, a role he openly embraced because it afforded him the opportunity to sing and dance. He would later appear in the television film The Brady Girls Get Married (1981) and the television film A Very Brady Christmas (1988). In 1989, he guest-starred as Mike Brady in "A Very Brady Episode" of the NBC sitcom Day by Day. Also in 1989, Reed reteamed with his Brady Bunch co-star Henderson in a guest-starring role on the sitcom Free Spirit. In 1990, he reprised the role of Mike Brady for the final time in the drama series The Bradys. The series was canceled after six episodes. Reed made his last onscreen appearance in an April 1992 episode of Jake and the Fatman, "Ain't Misbehavin'".

Shortly before his death, Reed appeared in the touring production of Love Letters, opposite Betsy Palmer, and taught classes on Shakespeare at UCLA.

Personal life 
Reed and fellow Northwestern student Marilyn Rosenberger married in July 1954. They had a daughter, Karen Rietz, before divorcing in 1959. 

Reed kept the fact that he was actually gay a close secret, since public knowledge of his sexual orientation would have damaged his career during that era.

Several years after his death, Reed's Brady Bunch co-stars – notably Barry Williams and Florence Henderson – publicly acknowledged his sexual orientation, and revealed that the cast and crew of The Brady Bunch knew.

Henderson spoke about Reed being in the closet during a 2000 interview with ABC News: "Here he was, the perfect father of this wonderful little family, a perfect husband. Off camera, he was an unhappy person – I think had Bob not been forced to live this double life, I think it would have dissipated a lot of that anger and frustration. I never asked him. I never challenged him. I had a lot of compassion for him because I knew how he was suffering with keeping this secret."

Regarding Reed's unwillingness to discuss his sexuality, even off-camera and in private, Williams told ABC News during a 2000 interview that "Robert didn't want to go there. I don't think he talked about it with anyone. I just don't think it was open for discussion–period. Had it ever come out that Robert Reed was gay, it probably would have caused the demise of the show. I think it would have hurt his career tremendously."

Death 
In November 1991, Reed was diagnosed with colon cancer. When he became ill, he allowed only his daughter Karen and actress Anne Haney, a close friend, to visit him. Haney later said of Reed, "He came from the old school, where people had a sense of decorum. He went the way he wanted to, without publicity." Weeks before his death, Reed called Henderson and asked her to inform the rest of The Brady Bunch cast that he was terminally ill. He died on May 12, 1992, at Huntington Memorial Hospital in Pasadena, California, at age 59.

Reed's death was initially attributed solely to cancer, but details from his death certificate were made public revealing that Reed was HIV-positive. It remains unknown how and when Reed contracted HIV because he kept his medical condition and private life a secret from the public until the day he died, telling only a few close friends. While Reed did not have AIDS at the time of his death, his doctor listed his HIV-positive status among "significant conditions that contributed to death" on the death certificate. He is buried at Memorial Park Cemetery in Skokie, Illinois.

Filmography

Film

Television

Award nominations

References

External links 
 
 
 

1932 births
1992 deaths
20th-century American male actors
AIDS-related deaths in California
Alumni of RADA
American gay actors
American male film actors
American male Shakespearean actors
American male stage actors
American male television actors
American television directors
Burials in Illinois
Deaths from cancer in California
Deaths from colorectal cancer
LGBT people from Illinois
LGBT people from Oklahoma
LGBT people from Texas
Male actors from Illinois
Male actors from Oklahoma
Male actors from Texas
Northwestern University School of Communication alumni
People from Highland Park, Illinois
People from Muskogee, Oklahoma
People from Navasota, Texas